Ajay Raj Singh (born 1 May 1978) is an Indian sprinter. He competed in the men's 4 × 100 metres relay at the 2000 Summer Olympics.

References

1978 births
Living people
Athletes (track and field) at the 2000 Summer Olympics
Indian male sprinters
Olympic athletes of India
Place of birth missing (living people)